Yiu Tung Estate is a public housing estate in Shau Kei Wan, Hong Kong Island, Hong Kong. The estate was constructed in a former squatter areas at a hill in Southwest Shau Kei Wan and consists of 11 residential buildings built in 1994 and 1995 respectively. The Yiu Tung Public Library is located within the estate.

Tung Chun Court and Tung Shing Court are Home Ownership Scheme housing courts in a former squatter areas at a hill in Southwest Shau Kei Wan, near Yiu Tung Estate, built in 1994 and 2000 respectively.

History
The foothills of Shau Kei Wan were once home to a vast area of squatter villages. In the mid-1980s, the government launched a plan to clear the squatter huts, resettle the inhabitants, and redevelop the area into modern and safe public housing. Clearance work began in 1987. The area became Yiu Tung Estate and Hing Tung Estate.

In early 1992, Yau Lee Holdings was awarded the HK$231-million contract to build the second phase of Yiu Tung Estate.

Visiting dignitaries were brought to the estate when it was new. During a January 1996 visit to Hong Kong, foreign secretary Malcolm Rifkind was given a tour by Chris Patten. Patten also brought Labour MP Derek Fatchett to Yiu Tung Estate in December 1996.

Houses

Yiu Tung Estate

Tung Chun Court

Tung Shing Court

Demographics
According to the 2016 by-census, Yiu Tung Estate had a population of 15,244 while Tung Chun Court had a population of 3,442. Altogether the population amounts to 18,686.

Politics
For the 2019 District Council election, the estate fell within two constituencies. Most of the estate and Tung Shing Court are located in the Lower Yiu Tung constituency, which is represented by Ho Wai-lun, while the remainder of the estate and Tung Chun Court falls within the Upper Yiu Tung constituency, which is represented by Chow Cheuk-ki.

See also

Public housing estates in Shau Kei Wan

References

Residential buildings completed in 1994
Residential buildings completed in 1995
Shau Kei Wan
Public housing estates in Hong Kong